Schelling is a surname. Notable persons with that name include:

 Caroline Schelling (1763–1809), German intellectual
 Friedrich Wilhelm Joseph Schelling (1775–1854), German philosopher
 Felix Emanuel Schelling (1858–1945), American educator
 Ernest Schelling (1876–1939), American composer
 Erich Schelling (1904–1986), German architect
 Thomas Schelling (1921–2016), American economist
 Andrew Schelling (born 1953), American poet and translator
 Hans Jörg Schelling (born 1953) Austrian entrepreneur
 Hans Schelling (1954–2008), Dutch sailor
 Florence Schelling (born 1989), Swiss ice hockey goaltender 
 Patrick Schelling (born 1990), Swiss cyclist

Other uses
 Schelling, Dutch name for the shilling
 Schelling, old name of the Dutch island of Terschelling
 Schelling-Salon, building in Bavaria

German-language surnames
Dutch-language surnames